This is a list of episodes for the Studio Pierrot anime series, Blue Dragon, based on the video game of the same name. The series' first season was broadcast on TV Tokyo for fifty-one episodes from April 2007 to March 2008. A second fifty-one episode season, titled Blue Dragon: Trials of the Seven Shadows, was broadcast from April 2008 to March 2009.

The series was licensed in English by Viz Media. The series aired in the United States on Cartoon Network and on their Toonami Jetstream streaming platform in 2008.

In 2011, Viz placed Blue Dragon and Trial of the Seven Shadows on vizanime.com and Hulu. The version available is the original Japanese version with English subtitles.

Episode list

Season 1 (2007-08)

Season 2 (2008-09)

DVD releases

Region 1

North America

Blue Dragon

Region 2

Japan

Blue Dragon

Blue Dragon: Tenkai no Shichi Ryu

United Kingdom

Blue Dragon

References

External links
 List and summary of episodes on TV Tokyo: Blue Dragon 
 Story and characters at Pierott's Official Blue Dragon 
 Blue Dragon 天界の七竜 TV Tokyo 
 web Newtype　公式サイト　アニメランド-地上波- 

Blue Dragon (franchise)
Lists of anime episodes